North High Street Historic District may refer to:

North High Street Historic District (Holyoke, Massachusetts), listed on the National Register of Historic Places in Hampden County, Massachusetts
North High Street Historic District (Canal Winchester, Ohio), listed on the National Register of Historic Places in Franklin County, Ohio

See also
High Street Historic District (disambiguation)